"Wasn't It Good" is a song by Australian singer-songwriter Tina Arena from her third studio album, Don't Ask (1994). Arena co-wrote the song along with Heather Field and Robert Parde, and it was produced by David Tyson. The song peaked at number 11 in Australia and received four nominations at the ARIA Awards in 1996. Upon release as a single, the title was rendered with an ellipsis ("Wasn't It Good...").

Arena has performed the song on most tours, including her 2004 Greatest Hits tour and 2012 Australian tour. It is track four on her 2004 Greatest Hits compilation.

Musical and lyrical content
"Wasn't It Good" was composed in the key of G, while the lyrics lament a past friendship that did not turn into a romantic relationship.

Award nominations

ARIA Awards
The ARIA Awards are presented annually from 1987 by the Australian Recording Industry Association (ARIA). "Wasn't It Good" was nominated in four categories, including Single of the Year. It did not win any awards.

|-
| rowspan="4"| 1996 || "Wasn't It Good" || Best Female Artist || 
|-
| "Wasn't It Good" || Best Pop Release || 
|-
| "Wasn't It Good" || Single of the Year || 
|-
| "Wasn't It Good" || Song of the Year || 
|-

APRA Awards
The Australasian Performing Right Association have presented the APRA Awards annually from 1982; "Wasn't It Good" was nominated in 1996 and won the Song of the Year.

|-
| 1996 || "Wasn't It Good" || Song of the Year || 
|-

Track listing
A five-track single was released through Columbia Records; it contains both the single edit and original album version of "Wasn't It Good", as well as live versions of three other tracks from Don't Ask.

Australian CD single
 "Wasn't It Good" (single version)
 "Greatest Gift" (live)
 "Love Is the Answer" (live)
 "Message" (live)
 "Wasn't It Good" (album version)

Charts

Weekly charts

Year-end charts

Certifications

References

1995 singles
APRA Award winners
Tina Arena songs
Columbia Records singles
Songs written by Tina Arena
1994 songs
Pop ballads